Mount Carmel is a borough in Northumberland County, located in the Coal Heritage Region of Central Pennsylvania's Susquehanna River Valley,  United States.  The population was 5,725 at the 2020 census.  It is located 88 miles (141 km) northwest of Philadelphia and 71 miles (114 km) northeast of Harrisburg, in the Coal Region. It is completely encircled by Mount Carmel Township.

History
Sawmill operator, Albert Bradford, gave Mount Carmel its name because of its elevation and beautiful setting in the mountains. He decided that it deserved a special name and named it after the holy mountain in Israel. Mount Carmel began as a logging town. Coal was only discovered in 1790 by Isaac Tomlinson. It took twenty-four years until the first shipment of anthracite was shipped from the borough. Mount Carmel Inn was opened in 1812 by Richard Yarnall and was strategically located on the Centre Turnpike (also known as the Reading-Sunbury Road or Old Reading Road) halfway between Pottsville and Danville.  During the latter part of 1854, the Philadelphia and Sunbury Railroad was completed from Shamokin to Mt. Carmel, which led to the opening and development of a number of collieries in the region.  During the same year, the Locust Mountain Coal and Iron Company commenced making extensive openings and improvements upon their valuable coal lands in the vicinity of Mt. Carmel, building coal breakers for two  collieries – the Coal Ridge and Locust Mountain collieries.  The township was erected in 1854, formed from part of Coal Township; by 1862 the borough was incorporated within the township.

Mount Carmel was among the first towns in the country to have its streets lit by electricity. Thomas Edison placed one of his first generators plants here in 1883. The Edison Plant in Mount Carmel was the seventh such in the world.

In the past, there were extensive anthracite mining interests here and in the vicinity. In earlier years, the borough had manufactories of miners' caps, cement blocks, cigars, shirts, stockings, etc., and large silk and planing mills, foundry and machine shops, a knitting mill, lumber yards, a packing plant, and wagon works.  Currently that area supports light manufacturing in paper and plastics.

Timeline 
 1681 March 4 – Charles II of England grants a land charter to William Penn to repay a debt of £20,000 owed to his father, creating the Province of Pennsylvania
 1682 August 24 – Penn divided the Province into three counties, Philadelphia, Bucks and Chester; The last comprised all lands west and south of the Delaware and the Schuylkill; therefore the site of Mount Carmel was originally in an area claimed by Chester County
 1729 May 10 – Lancaster County created out of part of Chester County
 1749 August 22 – Land comprising Mount Carmel part of a tract purchased from the Six Nations of the Iroquois Confederation
 1752 March 11 – Berks County created out of part of Lancaster County
 before 1770 – Area inhabited by Native Americans 
 1770 – Europeans first settled in the area
 1772 March 21 – Northumberland County formed, area that would become Mt. Carmel located in what was then Augusta Township
 1783 September 3 – Treaty of Paris signed, formally recognizing Pennsylvania's independence from the Kingdom of Great Britain
 1785 – Catawissa Township formed from part of Augusta township
 1788 – Ralpho Township formed from part of Catawissa township
 1789 – Ralpho township renamed to Shamokin township
 1790 – Anthracite coal discovered by Isaac Tomlinson on nearby Broad Mountain
 1805 March 25 – Centre Turnpike Company incorporated
 1808 – Centre Turnpike opens
 ~1811 – Centre Turnpike completed
 1812 – Mt. Carmel Inn opens, located on the Centre Turnpike in (then) Shamokin township
 ~1830s – coal mining begins
 1837 – Coal Township formed from parts of Little Mahanoy and Shamokin townships
 1846 – first Post Office opens
 1847 – land now comprising Mount Carmel Borough purchased by speculators
 1853 – town plot finalized
 1854 November 14 – Mount Carmel Township incorporated, from part of Coal Township
 1855 – Evangelical Grace Church, the town's first church, opens at Third & Market Streets
 1855 – Centre Turnpike decommissioned
 1862 November 3 – Mount Carmel Borough incorporated
 1862 - First industrial business. Blacksmith shop operated by David Evert 
 1869 – Our Lady of Mount Carmel Roman Catholic Church is built
 1877 December – Mt. Carmel Progress, the pioneer newspaper, was established
 1883 November 17 – Edison Electric Illuminating Company of Mount Carmel founded
 1888 – St. Matthew's Lutheran Church is built
 1894 November – Shamokin-Mount Carmel Electric Railway (trolley line) connecting Shamokin with Mount Carmel completed
 1896 – Reliance Colliery is started by Thomas Baumgardner
 1897 – Anthracite Brewing Company, later Mt. Carmel Brewery, founded
 1900 – Saint Stephen's Episcopal Church is Built
 1906 – Divine Redeemer Church is built
 1906 April – 'Miners Dispute' striking miners are shot by 21 troopers of the State Constabulary – ten men were injured, but all survived
 1914 – Sts. Peter and Paul Byzantine-Ukrainian Catholic Church is built (it later burned in a fire and was rededicated in 1994)
 1930 – The first viaduct was constructed to eliminate crossing two railroad tracks to enter town
 1931 – Mount Carmel High School football stadium or "Silver Bowl" is opened being one of the first high school stadiums to have lighting for night games
 1934 – Mattucci's Willow Cafe' opens
 1948 June 17 – United Airlines Flight 624 crashes near Midvalley Colliery No. 2; killing all 4 crew members and 39 passengers on board
 1950 – the coal mining 'boom' begins its decline
 1951 – Mt. Carmel Brewery closes
 1969 - WMIM Radio-  AM 1590 signs-on. Signed-off 1999.
 2003 – Original viaduct is removed and a reconstructed version is built by the Department of Transportation even though the railroads are no longer there

Geography

Mount Carmel is located at  (40.796447, −76.412231) in the  ridge-and-valley zone of the central Appalachian Mountains.  It is drained by the Shamokin Creek and is part of the Lower Susquehanna watershed. According to the United States Census Bureau, the borough has a total area of 0.7 square miles (1.7 km2), all  land.

Mount Carmel's terrain is mostly flat. The borough's land is mostly urban. Mount Carmel is served by Pennsylvania Route 61.

Demographics 

As of the census of 2000, there were 6,390 people, 3,035 households, and 1,678 families residing in the borough. The population density was 9,655.6 people per square mile (3,738.2/km2). There were 3,629 housing units at an average density of 5,483.6 per square mile (2,123.0/km2). The racial makeup of the borough was 98.56% White, 0.06% African American, 0.16% Native American, 0.28% Asian, 0.02% Pacific Islander, 0.25% from other races, and 0.67% from two or more races. Hispanic or Latino of any race were 0.89% of the population.

There were 3,035 households, out of which 21.9% had children under the age of 18 living with them, 38.8% were married couples living together, 12.1% had a female householder with no husband present, and 44.7% were non-families. 41.2% of all households were made up of individuals, and 24.7% had someone living alone who was 65 years of age or older. The average household size was 2.10 and the average family size was 2.86.

In the borough the population was spread out, with 19.7% under the age of 18, 7.0% from 18 to 24, 23.8% from 25 to 44, 23.6% from 45 to 64, and 25.9% who were 65 years of age or older. The median age was 45 years. For every 100 females, there were 87.9 males. For every 100 females age 18 and over, there were 82.6 males.

The median income for a household in the borough was $22,168, and the median income for a family was $35,217. Males had a median income of $28,168 versus $20,595 for females. The per capita income for the borough was $14,858. About 14.2% of families and 18.2% of the population were below the poverty line, including 29.1% of those under age 18 and 15.1% of those age 65 or over.

Politics

Federal 
United States Congress
Pennsylvania's 9th congressional district

State 
Pennsylvania General Assembly
Pennsylvania Senate, District 27
Pennsylvania House of Representatives, District 107

Education

Public schools 
The Mount Carmel Area School District operates three schools:
 Mount Carmel Area Elementary School (pre-K to 6)
 Mount Carmel Area JuniorHigh School (7–8)
Mount Carmel Area High School (9–12)

Transportation

Highways 
 Pennsylvania Route 61, designated from 1963 to the present, previously:
 1770 – 1808: King's Highway
 1808 – 1911: Centre Turnpike
 1911 – 1926: Pennsylvania State Highway No. 161
 1926 – 1935: U.S. Route 120
 1935 – 1963: U.S. Route 122
 Pennsylvania Route 54
 before 1929: Ashland Road
 1929 – 1961: PA 54 via Ashland Road
 1961 – 1966: designated as PA 45 via Ashland Road
 1966 – 1999: reassigned concurrent with PA 61 east of Mount Carmel
 1999–present: route changed to follow SR 2035, PA 901, SR 2042, SR 3002, and SR 4028 to rejoin its former route along PA 61.
 Pennsylvania Route 901
 Routed through Mount Carmel Township by 1996

Railroads 

 Danville and Pottsville Railroad → Philadelphia and Sunbury RR → Shamokin Valley and Pottsville Railroad → Northern Central Railway
 Quakake Railroad → Lehigh and Mahanoy Railroad → Lehigh Valley Railroad
 Philadelphia and Reading Railroad → Reading Company
 Pennsylvania Railroad
 Shamokin Valley Railroad
 Shamokin-Mount Carmel Electric Railway (trolley line)

Public transportation 
The Lower Anthracite Transportation System offers a two-route transit system weekdays and Saturdays from Mount Carmel with buses meeting in Coal Township to Mount Carmel and surrounding communities.  A third route, operated seasonally, operates to Knoebel's Amusement Resort.

Notable people
Ellen Dow – actress
Lieutenant General James M. Gavin (1907–1990), United States Army – aka "The Jumping General", he was the third Commanding General of the 82nd Airborne Division during World War II.
Henry Hynoski Sr. – NFL player (running back) for the Cleveland Browns in 1975 and father of Henry Hynoski.
Vaughn Nark – jazz musician (trumpet, flugelhorn, trombone).  Still touring in 2018.
Edward Pinkowski – journalist and historian of Polish Americans
Marie Powers – opera contralto singer who performed throughout Europe from the 1920s to the 1940s and then established herself on Broadway through the 1960s.
James M. Quigley – politician and lawyer
Brett Veach – General manager of the NFL football franchise Kansas City Chiefs beginning in 2017.

See also 
 Coal Region

References

External links 
Mount Carmel PA – municipal government website.

Populated places established in 1770
Municipalities of the Anthracite Coal Region of Pennsylvania
Boroughs in Northumberland County, Pennsylvania
Coal towns in Pennsylvania
1770 establishments in Pennsylvania